Natsusaka Dam is a gravity dam located in Aomori Prefecture in Japan. The dam is used for flood control. The catchment area of the dam is 19.8 km2. The dam impounds about 12  ha of land when full and can store 810 thousand cubic meters of water. The construction of the dam was started on 1960 and completed in 1966.

References

Dams in Aomori Prefecture
1996 establishments in Japan